The 1966 Quebec general election was held on June 5, 1966, to elect members of the Legislative Assembly of Quebec, Canada. The Union Nationale (UN), led by Daniel Johnson, Sr, defeated the incumbent Quebec Liberal Party, led by Jean Lesage.

In terms of the number of seats won, the election was one of the closest in recent history, with the UN winning 56 seats to the Liberals' 50.  Generally, Quebec's first past the post electoral system tends to produce strong disparities in the number of seats won even if the popular vote is fairly close. In this case, the most popular party did not win the most seats in the chamber. The Liberals won 6.5% more votes, but were denied a third term because the rural part of the province, where the Union Nationale did well, were slightly over-represented in the legislature.

The victory of the UN over the popular Lesage government was a surprise to many observers. Johnson's campaign was likely helped by his position that Quebec should get a better deal within the Canadian confederation, or should separate if it is unable to do so. In this sense, the forces of Quebec nationalism unleashed by the Quiet Revolution begun by Lesage may have contributed to his defeat, as many rural voters felt chagrin at the rapid pace of reform under the Liberals.

The pro-independence Rassemblement pour l'indépendance nationale and Ralliement national obtained a combined total of just under 9% of the popular vote (but no seats).

This was the last election for the "Legislative Assembly of Quebec". Legislation was passed to replace the bicameral system of Legislative Assembly and Legislative Council of Quebec with a single National Assembly of Quebec, effective December 31, 1968.

Daniel Johnson died in office in 1968, and was succeeded by Jean-Jacques Bertrand. Johnson's sons, Pierre-Marc and Daniel Jr, each later served as Premier of Quebec.

Results

Note:

* Party did not nominate candidates in the previous election.

See also
 List of Quebec premiers
 Politics of Quebec
 Timeline of Quebec history
 List of Quebec political parties
 28th National Assembly of Quebec

References

Further reading

External links
 CBC TV video clip

Quebec general election
Elections in Quebec
General election
Quebec general election